The Assistant Secretary of State for Educational and Cultural Affairs is the head of the Bureau of Educational and Cultural Affairs, a bureau within the United States Department of State.  The Assistant Secretary of State for Educational and Cultural Affairs reports to the Under Secretary of State for Public Diplomacy and Public Affairs.

Assistant Secretaries of State for Educational and Cultural Affairs, 1961—present 
Note: the post had been abolished from 1978 to 1999. In 1978 the Bureau was abolished and its functions transferred to the International Communications Agency (subsequently the United States Information Agency) under Reorganization Plan No. 2 (91 Stat. 1637). On October 1, 1999, pursuant to the integration of the U.S. Information Agency into the Department of State this position was revived.

References

External links 
 

 
Bureau of Educational and Cultural Affairs